Jean Joubert (27 February 1928 – 28 November 2015) was a French novelist, short story writer, and poet.

He won the 1978 Prix Mallarmé for Poems: 1955–1975. He won the 1975 Prix Renaudot for L'Homme de sable.

Life
Joubert was born in Châlette-sur-Loing, Loiret. He taught American literature at the Université Paul Valéry. He died on 28 November 2015, aged 87.

Works

Works in English

Black iris: poems, Translator Denise Levertov, Copper Canyon Press, 1988White owl and blue mouse, Translator Denise Levertov, Illustrator Michel Gay, Zoland Books, 1990, 

 Works in French 

NovelsLa Forêt blanche (White Forest), Grasset, 1969Un bon sauvage (A Good Savage), Grasset, 1972L'Homme de sable (Sandman), Grasset, 1975, Prix Renaudot. (adolescents - niveau lycée)Les Sabots rouges (Red Hooves), Grasset, 1979 et Éditions de l'Ecluse, 2007Mademoiselle Blanche (Miss White), Grasset 1990, et Domens poche 2008.Une Embellie, Actes Sud (An Embellishment, Acts South), 1996, (Prix Méditerranée des Lycéens, 1996)Les enfants de Noé (Noah's Children), 1988Un peu avant la nuit (A Little Before Dark), Actes Sud, 2001

 Poetry Les Lignes de la Main (Lines of the Hand), Seghers (Prix Artaud 1956)Les Poèmes - 1955-1975 (Poems - 1955-1975), Grasset, 1977 (Prix de l'Académie Mallarmé)Les Vingt-Cinq Heures du jour (Twenty-five Hours of the Day), Grasset, 1987La Main de feu, Grasset (The Hand of Fire), 1993, (adolescents)Anthologie personnelle (Personal Anthology), Actes Sud, 1997, (adolescents)Arche de la parole (Ark (?) of the World), Le Cherche-Midi, 2001État d'urgence : Poèmes (State of Emergency: Poems) 1996-2008, Editinter, 2008

 Short Stories Le Sphinx et autres récits (The Sphinx and Other Stories), Le Cherche-Midi, 1978L'Assistant français (The French Assistant), Entailles, Phulippe Nadal éditeur, 1988Claire dans le miroir et autres nouvelles (Claire in the Mirror and Other News), Mélis Éditions, 2004

 Children's novels Hibou blanc et souris bleue (White Owl and Blue Mouse), l'École des loisirs, 1978Mystère à Papendroch (Mystery in Papendroch), l'École des loisirs, 1982Histoires de la forêt profonde (Deep Forest Stories), l'École des loisirs, 1984Les Enfants de Noé (Noah's Children), l'École des loisirs, 1987Le Pays hors du monde (The Country Outside the World), l'École des loisirs, 1991À la recherche du rat-trompette (In Search of the Trumpet Rat), l'École des loisirs, 1993Bongrochagri, Éditions Grandir, 1994La Pie Magda (Pius Magda), belle brigande, l'École des loisirs, 1995Le Chien qui savait lire (The Dog Who Could Read), l'École des loisirs, 1996L'Été américain (American Summer), l'École des loisirs, 1998, (Médium poche)Mademoiselle Nuit (Miss Night), l'École des loisirs, 2000, (Médium poche)Blouson bleu (Blue Jacket), Autres Temps jeunesse, 2001Le Roi Jean et son chien (King John and his Dog), Grandir, 2001La jeune femme à la rose (The Young Lady With the Rose), l'École des loisirs, 2002Voyage à Poudrenville (Trip to Poudrenville), Éd. des Livres, 2003Adrien dragon (Dragon Adrian), Éditions Grandir, 2003Jean, il y a des souris dans la cuisine (Jean, there are Mice in the Kitchen), l'École des loisirs, 2005Mini-contes pour enfants pointus (Mini Tales for Sharp Children), Pluie d'Étoiles, 2007

Children's poetryPoèmes de la lune et de quelques étoiles (Poems of the Moon and Some Stars), l'École des loisirs, 1992L'Amitié des bêtes (The Friendship of Animals), l'École des loisirs, 1997La Maison du poète (The Poet's House), Éditions Pluie d'Étoiles, 1999Petite musique du jour (Little Music of the Day), Pluies d'Étoiles, 2004Chemin de neige Lo Païs d'enfance (Lo Pais Snow Trail), Éditions du Rocher, 2006Arbre, mon ami'' (Tree, my friend) (story-poem) Album, Éditions Grandir, 2009

References

External links 
http://poemsandtheirmusic.blogspot.com/2009/07/brilliant-sky-by-jean-joubert.html

People from Loiret
1928 births
2015 deaths
20th-century French novelists
21st-century French novelists
20th-century French poets
21st-century French poets
21st-century French male writers
Prix Renaudot winners
Winners of the Prix Broquette-Gonin (literature)
French children's writers
French male novelists
20th-century French male writers